The Noctilucaceae are a family of dinoflagellates. The family contains the widely distributed species Noctiluca scintillans.

References 

Dinoflagellate families
Dinophyceae